Bérianne is a district in Ghardaïa Province, Algeria. It was named after its capital, Bérianne.

Municipalities
The district is coextensive with its only municipality:
Bérianne, a town of 30,200 people which saw ethnic unrest in May 2008.

References

Districts of Ghardaïa Province